Dharmthai Plangsilp (born January 2, 1996), known professionally as Timethai, is a Thai singer, songwriter, and dancer.  Timethai was discovered in 2010 when Kamikaze's casting staff came across Timethai's YouTube videos which have been uploaded by a channel named 'Dharmthai'.  Timethai's dancing and choreography skills, cultivated since he was 7 years old, which couple uniquely with his ability to play traditional Thai instruments such as the Thai alto xylophone, Thai alto bamboo xylophone and Kong Wong, captured the attention of the casting staff, who offered Timethai a one-year singing and dancing training opportunity, and soon signed him to their label Kamikaze under RS PLC. He graduated with a bachelor's degree from Srinakarinwirot University.

Timethai's debut single, "No More", featuring Tomo and his unique hip-hop dancing style, was released in December 2011.  The music video "No More" reached more than 10,000,000 views on YouTube within just 5 months and have been discussed nationwide.  Timethai followed up the release of his debut single with his second single "The End" in April 2012. One month after its release, "The End" charted at number one in Thailand. Timethai is considered to be a rising newcomer in Thailand's music industry as well as Thailand's most popular young solo male artist.

Singles

Studio albums

Concerts

Television dramas
 20  (/Ch.) as 

Television series
 2022 Catch Me Baby (เซียนสับราง) (Bearcave Studio/WeTV) as Ben (เบน) (Cameo)

Television sitcom

Film
 20  as 

Music video appearance
 20  Ost. -  (/YouTube:)

Master of Ceremony: MC

References

External links 

 

1996 births
Living people
People from Bangkok
21st-century Thai male singers
Thai pop singers
Thai YouTubers